Diesel is an Indian Tamil language action drama film written and directed by Shanmugam Muthuswamy. It stars Harish Kalyan, Vinay Rai, Athulya Ravi, while Ananya, Sai Kumar, Karunas, Sachin Khedekar, Zakeer Hussain, Dheena, and Vivek Prasanna play supporting roles. It is produced by Third Eye Entertainment.

Plot
This film depicts the rise of Vasu (Harish Kalyan) in the smuggling syndicate of crude oil, petrol, and diesel mafia in India.

Cast
Harish Kalyan as Vasu
Vinay Rai
Athulya Ravi
Ananya
Sai Kumar
Karunas
Sachin Khedekar
Zakeer Hussain
Dheena
Vivek Prasanna
Prem
Vinod Sagar
Thangadurai
Surekha Vani
Ravi Venkatraman

References

2020s Tamil-language films
2020s Indian films
2022 thriller films